For My Thugz is the second studio album by American rapper Lil Boosie. It was released on January 1, 2002, by Trill Entertainment. To date, the album has sold 90,000 in the United States.

Track listing

References

2002 albums
Lil Boosie albums